Felipe Santiago Xicoténcatl (May 1, 1804 – September 13, 1847) was a colonel in the Mexican Army under president Antonio López de Santa Anna.

Xicoténcatl was born in the town of San Bernandino Contla in the state of Tlaxcala. He joined the army in 1829 as a lieutenant. In 1843 he became lieutenant colonel. During the Mexican-American War Lt. Colonel Xicoténcatl led the San Blas Battalion. It is said that Lt. Col. Xicoténcatl in the Battle of Chapultepec, refusing the idea of letting the American forces capture the Mexican flag identifying his battalion and severely wounded, wrapped himself with the flag and died beside his men.

External links 
 Soy Nahuatl 
 Biografias 

Mexican military officers
Mexican military personnel killed in the Mexican–American War
People from Tlaxcala
1804 births
1847 deaths